

People with the name Bindy

Nickname
Bindy or Bindi is a commonly used abbreviation of the girl's name Belinda.

Bindy Johal; "Bindy" Bhupinder Singh Johal (1971-1998) organized crime leader
Belinda Hocking; "Bindy" Belinda Jane Hocking (born 1990) Australian swimmer

Given name
Fictional characters
Bindy Mackenzie, the title character Jaclyn Moriarty's novel The Betrayal of Bindy Mackenzie

Surname
 Serge Bindy (born 1954), Swiss pentathlete

Other
 "Bindy" (1998 song), song from the disc Cowboy Bebop No Disc, see Music of Cowboy Bebop
 Software product focused on brand standards, retail communication and store execution. See bindy.com.

See also
 Bindi (name)